Richmond is a city within Metro Detroit in the U.S. state of Michigan. The population was 5,735 at the 2010 census. Most of the city is located in Macomb County, though there is a small portion in neighboring St. Clair County. The city is adjacent to Richmond Township and Lenox Township in Macomb County, although it is administratively autonomous. It is also adjacent to St. Clair County's Columbus Township and Casco Township.

Neighborhoods
It was so named because it was the principal slaughterhouse for what was predominantly a sheep raising area.

Geography
Richmond is considered an outer-ring Detroit suburb and is located within Metro Detroit.
It is sometimes considered to be part of the Thumb of Michigan
Richmond can also be considered as in the Blue Water Area, a subregion of the Thumb.

Demographics

2010 census
As of the census of 2010, there were 5,735 people living in the city. The racial makeup of the city was 94.2% White, 1.0% African American, 0.3% Native American, 0.2% Asian, 0.2% Pacific Islander, 2.6% from other races, and 1.5% from two or more races. Hispanic or Latino of any race were 4.6% of the population.

2000 census
As of the census of 2000, there were 4,897 people, 1,977 households, and 1,332 families living in the city. The racial makeup of the city was 95.43% White, 0.25% African American, 0.31% Native American, 0.82% Asian, 0.18% Pacific Islander, 1.86% from other races, and 1.16% from two or more races. Hispanic or Latino of any race were 4.74% of the population.

There were 1,977 households, out of which 31.9% had children under the age of 18 living with them, 53.1% were married couples living together, 10.1% had a female householder with no husband present, and 32.6% were non-families. 27.8% of all households were made up of sole individuals and 11.0% had someone living alone who was 65 years of age or older.  The average household size was 2.45 and the average family size was 2.99.

In the city the population was spread out, with 24.2% under the age of 18, 9.0% from 18 to 24, 30.8% from 25 to 44, 22.7% from 45 to 64, and 13.3% who were 65 years of age or older.  The median age was 36 years. For every 100 females there were 92.1 males.  For every 100 females age 18 and over, there were 89.6 males.

The median income for a household in the city was $43,378, and the median income for a family was $57,917. Males had a median income of $41,519 versus $26,445 for females. The per capita income for the city was $21,384.  About 4.8% of families and 6.2% of the population were below the poverty line, including 7.2% of those under age 18 and 5.4% of those age 65 or over.

City history

In 1835, Erastus Beebe set out with two brothers and several other people to create a new city out of a wilderness area in Michigan. He founded Beebe's Corners, which in 1878 agreed to join with the two nearest neighboring communities of Ridgeway and Cooper Town to form the Village of Richmond. In 1879, the Michigan Legislature officially created the village charter. In 1989, the city annexed the Muttonville area of Lenox Township, parts of Richmond Township in Macomb County, and part of Casco and Columbus Townships in St. Clair County.

Arts and recreation

The city has a local library and a local community theatre (Richmond Community Theatre).

The city has three major parks – Beebe Street Memorial Park, Bailey Park, and Gierk Park. Bailey Park is a  park with a baseball field, soccer field, and four tennis courts. Gierk Park is approximately one acre and includes a small playground. Various other outdoor recreational facilities can be found adjacent to the public school buildings, St. Augustine Catholic Elementary School, and St. Peter Lutheran School.

The city is a starting point for the Macomb Orchard Trail, which is a  multi-use, non-motorized trail currently being developed on an abandoned railroad right-of-way in Northern Macomb County.  The new trail also connects with the Stony Creek Metropark, Bloomer Park, and the Paint Creek Trail.

Each year the city hosts the Richmond Good Old Days Festival. The bulk of the festival's activities occur at Beebe Street Memorial Park.  Major events at past festivals have included the "Little Miss Richmond" pageant, sporting tournaments, demolition derby, figure 8 derby, fair-cross, musical entertainment, craft show, and fireworks. The festival hosts a children's parade and a grand parade.  The Detroit News voted the grand parade Michigan's Best Small Town Parade in 2004, 2005, and 2006.

The local paper was the Richmond Review, which was bought out by The Voice.

Education
The Richmond Community School District covers areas of Richmond, Lenox, Casco, and Columbus townships. It includes an elementary, middle, and high school. In 2002, it had approximately 2,000 full-time students and a teacher/student ratio of 1:20. St. Augustine is a Catholic Elementary School in the city and St. Peter's is a Lutheran Elementary School in the city.

Historic buildings
The First Congregational Church, home of the Richmond Community Theatre, is listed on the National Register of Historic Places, and the State of Michigan placed a historical marker in front of the Harold and Mabelle Weller House.  Kathryn Bishop Eckert's Buildings of Michigan lists St. Augustine Church as an architecturally important building due to its twin steeples, Italian gothic elements, and fieldstone facade.

The Richmond Area Historical and Genealogical Society owns and maintains three historic buildings and one replica building in Bailey Historic Park.  The buildings include:  1) a one-room schoolhouse built in 1885 and originally located on School Section Road in Richmond Township; 2) a Grand Trunk Railroad Depot built in the early 1900s and originally located in Hickey, which was in Columbus Township, MI, and 3) the Donley Family Log Cabin and Outhouse, which were built in 1850 and originally located on 29 Mile Road in Lenox Township.  The newest building is a replica of a Blacksmith Shop that serves as the Society's museum and office.  Grand opening of the blacksmith shop was held in 2009.  Check the society's website for current museum display information.

Notable people
 Andrea LaFontaine, elected as a Republican state representative in 2010 at the age of 23. She received a great deal of press attention because of her youth.
 Steve Mazur, lead guitarist for Our lady peace
 Joseph Cella, former United States Ambassador to Fiji, Kiribati, Tonga, Tuvalu, and Nauru. He was raised in Richmond, and is a 1983 graduate of St. Augustine Catholic School in Richmond.
Jeff Gutt Lead Singer for Stone Temple Pilots

References

External links

Official website

Cities in Macomb County, Michigan
Cities in St. Clair County, Michigan
Cities in Michigan
Metro Detroit
Populated places established in 1879
1879 establishments in Michigan